The Obstetrical Society of London existed from 1858 to 1907.

History
The Society was set up in 1858, the successor to an Obstetric Society dating from 1825, and in the aftermath of the Medical Act 1858. The founding group included James Hobson Aveling, Robert Barnes, Graily Hewitt, Henry Oldham, Edward Rigby, William Tyler Smith, Thomas Hawkes Tanner, and John Edward Tilt., Sir Charles Locock and Sir George Duncan Gibb.

Over its first 15 years the membership of the Society rose to about 600. The Act's proposals included regulation of medical practitioners, taken at the time to include midwifery; and the Society turned in time to certifying midwives. The diploma introduced in 1872 recognised the role of the midwife, in supervising "normal labour".

A dispute over ovariotomy, which other members opposed, led Barnes to leave and found the British Gynaecological Society in 1884. In the election for the presidency at the end of that year, matters came to a head when Alfred Meadows, supported by Aveling and Barnes, failed to be chosen by the Council. In 1907 both societies merged into the Royal Society of Medicine.

Presidents
Presidents of the Society served a two-year term.

1859 Edward Rigby
1861 William Tyler Smith
1863 Henry Oldham
1865 Robert Barnes
1867 John Hall Davis
1869 Graily Hewitt
1871 John Braxton Hicks
1873 Edward John Tilt
1875 William Overend Priestley
1877 Charles West
1879 William Smoult Playfair
1881 James Matthews Duncan
1883 Henry Gervis
1885 John Baptiste Potter
1887 John Williams
1889 Alfred Lewis Galabin
1891 James Watt Black
1893 George Ernest Herman
1895 Francis Henry Champneys
1897 Charles James Cullingworth
1899 Alban Doran
1901 Peter Horrocks
1903 Edward Malins
1905 William Radford Dakin
1907 Herbert Ritchie Spencer, who became President of the Obstetrical and Gynaecological Section of the Royal Society of Medicine after the merger.

Notes

Scientific societies based in the United Kingdom
Medical and health organisations based in London
1858 establishments in England
1907 disestablishments in England
Medical associations based in the United Kingdom
Scientific organizations established in 1858
Science and technology in London
Obstetrics and gynaecology organizations
1858 in London